"Get Down Tonight" is a song released in 1975 on the self-titled album by the disco group KC and the Sunshine Band. The song became widely successful, becoming the first of their five No. 1 hits on the Billboard Hot 100. It also reached the top of the Hot Soul Singles chart and was an international chart hit, reaching No. 1 in Canada and charting in Australia (No. 44), Belgium (No. 11), the Netherlands (No. 5), and the UK (No. 21).

Composition
The song displays some of the signature characteristics of the disco era such as a fast tempo and repeating lyrics. The song also features a distinctive introduction, employing a guitar solo rendered at double-speed.

The song was originally titled "What You Want Is What You Get" before KC changed the title to "Get Down Tonight".

Sampling
In 1998, the song was sampled by the house production act Bamboo for the hit single "Bamboogie". The song reached No. 2 in the UK Singles Chart in January 1998.

Chart performance

Weekly charts

Year-end charts

Certifications

See also
List of Billboard Hot 100 number-one singles of 1975
List of Cash Box Top 100 number-one singles of 1975
List of number-one R&B singles of 1975 (U.S.)
List of number-one singles of 1975 (Canada)

References

External links
 at TopPop

1975 singles
1975 songs
KC and the Sunshine Band songs
Billboard Hot 100 number-one singles
Cashbox number-one singles
RPM Top Singles number-one singles
Songs written by Harry Wayne Casey
Songs written by Richard Finch (musician)
TK Records singles